, officially , and sometimes called as Tokyo Haneda Airport or Haneda International Airport , is one of two international airports serving the Greater Tokyo Area, the other one being Narita International Airport (NRT). It serves as the primary base of Japan's two major domestic airlines, Japan Airlines (Terminal 1) and All Nippon Airways (Terminal 2), as well as Air Do, Skymark Airlines, Solaseed Air, and StarFlyer.

Haneda was the primary international airport serving Tokyo until 1978; from 1978 to 2010, Haneda handled almost all domestic flights to and from Tokyo as well as "scheduled charter" flights to a small number of major cities in East and Southeast Asia, while Narita International Airport handled the vast majority of international flights from further locations. In 2010, a dedicated international terminal, currently Terminal 3, was opened at Haneda in conjunction with the completion of a fourth runway, allowing long-haul flights during night-time hours. Haneda opened up to long-haul service during the daytime in March 2014, with carriers offering nonstop service to 25 cities in 17 countries.

The Japanese government constantly encourages the use of Haneda for premium business routes and the use of Narita for leisure routes and by low-cost carriers.  However, the major full-service carriers may have a choice to fly to both airports. Haneda handled 87,098,683 passengers in 2018; by passenger throughput, it was the third-busiest airport in Asia and the fourth-busiest in the world, after Hartsfield–Jackson Atlanta International Airport, Beijing Capital International Airport (Asia's busiest), and Dubai International Airport. It is able to handle 90 million passengers per year following its expansion in 2018. With Haneda and Narita combined, Tokyo has the third-busiest city airport system in the world, after London and New York.

In 2020, Haneda was named the second best airport after Singapore's Changi Airport and the World's Best Domestic Airport, As of 2021, Haneda was rated by Skytrax as the second Best Airport in-between Qatar's Hamad International Airport and Singapore's Changi Airport, and maintaining its best Domestic Airport title from the previous year.

History
Before the construction of Haneda Airport, Tachikawa Airfield was Tokyo's primary airport. It was the main operating base of Japan Air Transport, then the country's flag carrier. In 1930, the Japanese postal ministry purchased a  portion of reclaimed land from a private individual in order to construct an airport.

Empire/war era (1931–1945)

 first opened in 1931 on a small piece of reclaimed land at the west end of today's airport complex. A  concrete runway, a small airport terminal and 2 hangars were constructed. The first flight from the airport on August 25, 1931, carried a load of insects to Dalian.

During the 1930s, Haneda handled flights to destinations in Japan mainland, Taiwan, Korea (both under Japanese rule) and Manchuria (ruled by Manchukuo). The major Japanese newspapers also built their first flight departments at Haneda during this time, and Manchukuo National Airways began service between Haneda and Hsinking. JAT was renamed Imperial Japanese Airways following its nationalization in 1938. Passenger and freight traffic grew dramatically in these early years. The airport's size grew to  using land purchased by the postal ministry from a nearby exercise ground.

During World War II, both IJA and Haneda Airport shifted to almost exclusively military transport services. Haneda Airport was also used by the Imperial Japanese Navy Air Service for flight training during the war.

In the late 1930s, the Tokyo government planned a new Tokyo Municipal Airport on an artificial island in Koto Ward. At , the airport would have been five times the size of Haneda at the time, and significantly larger than Tempelhof Airport in Berlin, which was said to be the largest airport in the world at the time. The airport plan was finalized in 1938 and work on the island began in 1939 for completion in 1941, but the project fell behind schedule due to resource constraints during World War II. This plan was officially abandoned following the war, as the Allied occupation authorities favored expanding Haneda rather than building a new airport; the island was later expanded by dumping garbage into the bay, and is now known as Yumenoshima.

U.S. occupation (1945–1952)

On September 12, 1945, General Douglas MacArthur, Supreme Commander for the Allied Powers and head of the Occupation of Japan following World War II, ordered that Haneda be handed over to the occupation forces. On the 21st, over 3,000 residents received orders to leave their homes within 48 hours. Many resettled on the other side of a river in the Haneda district of Ota, surrounding Anamoriinari Station, and some still live in the area today. The expansion work commenced in October 1945 and was completed in June 1946, at which point the airport covered . Haneda AAF was designated as a port of entry to Japan.

Haneda was mainly a military and civilian transportation base used by the U.S. Army and Air Force as a stop-over for C-54 transport planes departing San Francisco, en route to the Far East and returning flights. A number of C-54s, based at Haneda AFB, participated in the Berlin Blockade airlift. These planes were specially outfitted for hauling coal to German civilians. Many of these planes were decommissioned after their participation due to coal dust contamination. Several US Army or Air Force generals regularly parked their personal planes at Haneda while visiting Tokyo, including General Ennis Whitehead. During the Korean War, Haneda was the main regional base for United States Navy flight nurses, who evacuated patients from Korea to Haneda for treatment at military hospitals in Tokyo and Yokosuka. US military personnel based at Haneda were generally housed at the Washington Heights residential complex in central Tokyo (now Yoyogi Park).

Haneda Air Force Base received its first international passenger flights in 1947 when Northwest Orient Airlines began DC-4 flights across the North Pacific to the United States, and within Asia to China, South Korea, and the Philippines. Pan American World Airways made Haneda a stop on its "round the world" route later in 1947, with westbound DC-4 service to Shanghai, Hong Kong, Kolkata, Karachi, Damascus, Istanbul, London and New York, and eastbound Constellation service to Wake Island, Honolulu and San Francisco.

The U.S. military gave part of the base back to Japan in 1952; this portion became known as Tokyo International Airport. The US military maintained a base at Haneda until 1958 when the remainder of the property was returned to the Japanese government.

International era (1952–1978)

Japan's flag carrier Japan Airlines began its first domestic operations from Haneda in 1951. For a few postwar years Tokyo International Airport did not have a passenger terminal building. The Japan Airport Terminal Co., Ltd.  was founded in 1953 to develop the first passenger terminal, which opened in 1955. An extension for international flights opened in 1963. European carriers began service to Haneda in the 1950s. Air France arrived at Haneda for the first time in November 1952. BOAC de Havilland Comet flights to London via the southern route began in 1953, and SAS DC-7 flights to Copenhagen via Anchorage began in 1957. JAL and Aeroflot began cooperative service from Haneda to Moscow in 1967. Pan Am and Northwest Orient used Haneda as a hub. The August 1957 Official Airline Guide shows 86 domestic and 8 international departures each week on Japan Air Lines. Other international departures per week: seven Civil Air Transport, three Thai DC4s, 2 Hong Kong Airways Viscounts (and maybe three DC-6Bs), two Air India and one QANTAS. Northwest had 16 departures a week, Pan Am had 12 and Canadian Pacific had four; Air France three, KLM three, SAS five, Swissair two and BOAC three. As of 1966, the airport had three runways: 15L/33R, 15R/33L and 4/22.

The Tokyo Monorail opened between Haneda and central Tokyo in 1964, in time for the Tokyo Olympics. During 1964 Japan lifted travel restrictions on its citizens, causing passenger traffic at the airport to swell. The introduction of jet aircraft in the 1960s followed by the Boeing 747 in 1970 also required various facility improvements at Haneda, including repurposing the original runway 15R/33L as an airport apron. Around 1961, the government began considering further expansion of Haneda with a third runway and additional apron space, but forecast that the expansion would only meet capacity requirements for about ten years following completion. In 1966, the government decided to build a new airport for international flights. In 1978, Narita Airport opened, taking over almost all international service in the Greater Tokyo Area, and Haneda became a domestic airport.

Domestic era (1978–2010)

While most international flights moved from Haneda to Narita in 1978, airlines based in the Republic of China on Taiwan continued to use Haneda Airport for many years due to the ongoing political conflict between the Republic of China (Taiwan) and the People's Republic of China (China). China Airlines served Taipei and Honolulu from Haneda; Taiwan's second major airline, EVA Air, joined CAL at Haneda in 1999. All Taiwan flights were moved to Narita in 2002, and Haneda-Honolulu services ceased. In 2003, JAL, ANA, Korean Air and Asiana began service to Gimpo Airport in Seoul, providing a "scheduled charter" city-to-city service.

The Transport Ministry released an expansion plan for Haneda in 1983 under which it would be expanded onto new landfill in Tokyo Bay with the aim of increasing capacity, reducing noise and making use of the large amount of garbage generated by Tokyo. In July 1988, a new  runway opened on the landfill. In September 1993, the old airport terminal was replaced by a new West Passenger Terminal, nicknamed "Big Bird", which was built farther out on the landfill. New C (parallel) and B (cross) runways were completed in March 1997 and March 2000 respectively. In 2004, Terminal 2 opened at Haneda for ANA and Air Do; the 1993 terminal, now known as Terminal 1, became the base for JAL, Skymark and Skynet Asia Airways.

In October 2006, Japanese Prime Minister Shinzo Abe and Chinese Premier Wen Jiabao reached an informal agreement to launch bilateral talks regarding an additional city-to-city service between Haneda and Shanghai Hongqiao International Airport. On 25 June 2007, the two governments concluded an agreement allowing for the Haneda-Hongqiao service to commence from October 2007. Since August 2015, Haneda also began flight services to Shanghai's other airport, Shanghai Pudong International Airport (where most flights operate from Narita International Airport) which means there is no longer a city-to-city service between Tokyo and Hongqiao Airport as all flights from Haneda and Shanghai are focused at Pudong Airport.

In December 2007, Japan and the People's Republic of China reached a basic agreement on opening charter services between Haneda and Beijing Nanyuan Airport. However, because of difficulties in negotiating with the Chinese military operators of Nanyuan, the first charter flights in August 2008 (coinciding with the 2008 Summer Olympics) used Beijing Capital International Airport instead, as did subsequent scheduled charters to Beijing.

In June 2007, Haneda gained the right to host international flights that depart between 8:30 pm and 11:00 pm and arrive between 6 am and 8:30 am. The airport allows departures and arrivals between 11 pm and 6 am, as Narita Airport is closed during these hours.

Macquarie Bank and Macquarie Airports owned a 19.9% stake in Japan Airport Terminal until 2009, when they sold their stake back to the company.

Expansion of international service (2010–2014)

A third terminal for international flights was completed in October 2010. The cost to construct the five-story terminal building and attached 2,300-car parking deck was covered by a private finance initiative process, revenues from duty-free concessions and a facility use charge of ¥2,000 per passenger. Both the Tokyo Monorail and the Keikyū Airport Line added stops at the new terminal, and an international air cargo facility was constructed nearby. The fourth runway (05/23), which is called D Runway, was also completed in 2010, having been constructed via land reclamation to the south of the existing airfield. This runway was designed to increase Haneda's operational capacity from 285,000 movements to 407,000 movements per year, permitting increased frequencies on existing routes, as well as routes to new destinations. In particular, Haneda would offer additional slots to handle 60,000 overseas flights a year (30,000 during the day and 30,000 during late night and early morning hours).

In May 2008, the Japanese Ministry of Transport announced that international flights would be allowed between Haneda and any overseas destination, provided that such flights must operate between 11 pm and 7 am.

30,000 annual international slots became available upon the opening of the International Terminal, current Terminal 3, in October 2010 and were allocated to government authorities in several countries for further allocation to airlines. While service to Seoul, Taipei, Shanghai and other regional destinations continued to be allowed during the day, long-haul services were initially limited to overnight hours. Many long-haul services from Haneda struggled, such as British Airways service to London (temporarily suspended and then restored on a less than daily basis before becoming a daily daytime service) and Air Canada service to Vancouver (announced but never commenced until Air Canada began a code share on ANA's Haneda-Vancouver flight). Delta Air Lines replaced its initial service to Detroit with service to Seattle before cancelling the service entirely in favor for the daytime services to Los Angeles and Minneapolis (although both the Detroit and the Seattle services have since resumed as daytime services). In October 2013, American Airlines announced the cancellation of its service between Haneda and New York JFK stating that it was "quite unprofitable" owing to the schedule constraints at Haneda.

Haneda Airport's new International Terminal has received numerous complaints from passengers using it during night hours. One of the complaints is the lack of amenities available in the building as most restaurants and shops are closed at night. Another complaint is that there is no affordable public transportation at night operating out of the terminals. The Keikyu Airport Line, Tokyo Monorail and most bus operators stop running services out of Haneda by midnight, and so passengers landing at night are forced to go by car or taxi to their destination. A Haneda spokesperson said that they would work with transportation operators and the government to improve the situation.

Daytime international slots were allocated in October 2013. In the allocation among Japanese carriers, All Nippon Airways argued that it should receive more international slots than Japan Airlines due to JAL's recent government-supported bankruptcy restructuring, and ultimately won 11 daily slots to JAL's five. Nine more daytime slot pairs were allocated for service to the United States in February 2016. They were intended to be allocated along with the other daytime slots, but allocation talks were stalled in 2014, leading the Japanese government to release these slots for charter services to other countries meanwhile. The new daytime slots led to increased flight capacity between Tokyo and many Asian markets, but did not have a major effect on capacity between Japan and Europe, as several carriers simply transferred flights from Narita to Haneda (most notably ANA and Lufthansa services to Germany, which almost entirely shifted to Haneda). In an effort to combat this effect, the Ministry of Land, Infrastructure and Transport gave non-binding guidance to airlines that any new route at Haneda should not lead to the discontinuation of a route at Narita, although it was possible for airlines to meet this requirement through cooperation with a code sharing partner (for instance, ANA moved its London flight to Haneda while maintaining a code share on Virgin Atlantic's Narita-London flight).

An expansion of the new international terminal was completed at the end of March 2014. The expansion includes a new 8-gate pier to the northwest of the existing terminal, an expansion of the adjacent apron with four new aircraft parking spots, a hotel inside the international terminal, and expanded check-in, customs/immigration/quarantine and baggage claim areas.

In addition to its international slot restrictions, Haneda remains subject to domestic slot restrictions; domestic slots are reallocated by MLIT every five years, and each slot is valued at 2–3 billion yen in annual income.

Future expansion plans (since 2014)

Following Tokyo's winning bid for the 2020 Summer Olympics, the Japanese government plans to increase the combined slot capacity of Haneda and Narita, and to construct a new railway line linking from Haneda Airport to Tokyo Station in approximately 18 minutes.

JR East has considered extending an existing freight line from Tamachi Station on the Yamanote Line to create a third rail link to the airport, which may potentially be connected to the Ueno–Tokyo Line to offer a through connection to Ueno and points on the Utsunomiya Line and Takasaki Line. Although there had been discussion of completing this extension prior to the 2020 Olympics, the plan was indefinitely shelved in 2015.

The Ministry of Land, Infrastructure and Transport is planning a new road tunnel between the domestic and international terminals in order to shorten minimum connecting times between the terminals from the current 60–80 minutes.

Haneda suffers from airspace restrictions due to its position between Yokota Air Base to the west and Narita International Airport to the east. Due to these airfields' requirements and noise concerns, Haneda flights generally arrive and depart using circular routes over Tokyo Bay. A new arrival corridor over western Tokyo and a new departure corridor over Yokohama, Kawasaki and central Tokyo, which is limited to afternoon hours, was added on 29 March 2020. Additional taxiways must be constructed in order for Haneda to handle more flights, and construction is expected to take around three years.

Facilities
Haneda Airport has three passenger terminals. Terminal 1 and 2 are connected by an underground walkway. A free inter-terminal shuttle bus connects all terminals on the landside. Route A runs between Terminal 1 and 2 every four minutes and Route B runs oneway from Terminal 3, 2, 1, then back to Terminal 3 every four minutes.

Haneda Airport is open 24 hours, although Terminal 1 and the domestic flight areas of Terminal 2 are only open from 5:00 am to 12:00 am. Terminal hours may be extended to 24-hour operation due to StarFlyer's late-night and early-morning service between Haneda and Kitakyushu, which began in March 2006. Terminal 3 and the international flight area of Terminal 2 are open 24 hours a day.

All three passenger terminals are managed and operated by private companies. The critical facilities of the airport such as runways, taxiways and aprons are managed by Ministry of Land, Infrastructure, Transport and Tourism. As of March 2013, Terminal 1 and 2 have 47 jetways altogether.

Terminals

Terminal 1
Terminal 1 called "Big Bird" opened in 1993, replacing the smaller 1970 terminal complex. It is exclusively used for domestic flights within Japan and is served by Japan Airlines, Skymark Airlines, and StarFlyer’s routes.

The linear building features a six-story restaurant, shopping area and conference rooms in its center section and a large rooftop observation deck with open-air rooftop café. The terminal has gates 1 through 24 assigned for jet bridges and gates 31–40 and 84–90 assigned for ground boarding by bus.

Terminal 2
Terminal 2 opened on December 1, 2004. The construction of Terminal 2 was financed by levying a ¥170 (from 1 April 2011) passenger service facility charge on tickets, the first domestic Passenger Service Facilities Charge (PSFC) in Japan.

Terminal 2 is served by All Nippon Airways, Air Do, and Solaseed Air for their domestic flights. On March 29, 2020, some international flights operated by All Nippon Airways were relocated to Terminal 2 after the addition of international departure halls and CIQ facilities (Customs, Immigration, Quarantine) in preparation for 2020 Summer Olympics in Tokyo. However, the international departures and check-in hall was closed indefinitely on April 11, 2020, less than two weeks since its opening, due to the COVID-19 pandemic.

The terminal features an open-air rooftop restaurant, a six-story shopping area with restaurants and the 387-room Haneda Excel Hotel Tokyu. The terminal has gates 51 through 73 assigned with jet bridges (gates 51 to 65 for domestic flights, gates 66 to 70 for domestic or international flights, gates 71 to 73 for international flights), gates 46–48 in satellite, and gates 500 through 511 (for domestic flights) and gates 700 through 702 (for international flights) assigned for ground boarding by bus.

Terminal 3
Terminal 3, formerly called International Terminal, opened on October 21, 2010, replacing the much smaller 1998 International Terminal adjacent to Terminal 2. The terminal serves most international flights at Haneda, except for some All Nippon Airways flights departing from Terminal 2. The first two long-haul flights were scheduled to depart after midnight on October 31, 2010, from the new terminal, but both flights departed ahead of schedule before midnight on October 30.

Terminal 3 has airline lounges operated by All Nippon Airways (Star Alliance), Japan Airlines (oneworld), Cathay Pacific Airways (oneworld), and Delta Air Lines (SkyTeam). The terminal has gates 105–114 and 140–149 assigned with jet bridges and gates 131 through 139 assigned for ground boarding by bus.

The International Terminal was renamed to Terminal 3 on March 14, 2020, as Terminal 2 began handling some international flights operated by All Nippon Airways from March 29, 2020.

Airlines and destinations

Passenger

Cargo

Statistics

Source: Japanese Ministry of Land, Infrastructure, Transport and Tourism

Busiest domestic routes (2018)

Number of landings

Number of passengers

Cargo volume (tonnes)

On-time performance 
In 2022 Haneda Airport was the most on-time international airport with the fewest delays. Flights departing Haneda had a 90.3% on-time departure rate across 373,264 total flights according to aviation analytics firm Cirium.

Ground transportation

Rapid transit

Haneda Airport is served by the Keikyu Airport Line and Tokyo Monorail. In addition, East Japan Railway Company has proposed building a new Haneda Airport Access Line connecting directly to central Tokyo by 2029.

The monorail has three dedicated stations at the Terminal 1, Terminal 2 and Terminal 3, while Keikyū operates a single station between the Terminals 1 and 2 (Terminal 1·2 Station) and a stop at the Terminal 3.

For both the monorail and Keikyu, the Terminal 3 Station was renamed from International Terminal Station in March 2020. The Keikyu Domestic Terminal station was renamed to the Terminal 1·2 Station.

Keikyū offers trains to Shinagawa Station and Yokohama Station and through service to the Toei Asakusa Line, which makes several stops in eastern Tokyo. Some Keikyū trains also run through to the Keisei Oshiage Line and Keisei Main Line, making it possible to reach Narita International Airport by train. Airport Limited Express trains make the nonstop run from Haneda Airport to Shinagawa in 11 minutes.

Tokyo Monorail trains run between the airport and Hamamatsuchō Station, where passengers can connect to the Yamanote Line to reach other points in Tokyo, or Keihin Tohoku Line to Saitama, and have a second access option to Narita Airport via Narita Express or Sōbu Line (Rapid) Trains at Tokyo Station. Haneda Express trains make the non-stop run from Haneda Airport to Hamamatsuchō in approximately 18 to 19 minutes. Hamamatsuchō Station is also located adjacent to the Toei Ōedo Line Daimon station.

Road
The airport is bisected by the Shuto Expressway Bayshore Route and Japan National Route 357, while Shuto Expressway Route 1 and Tokyo Metropolitan Route 311 (Kampachi-dori Ave) runs on the western perimeter. Tamagawa Sky Bridge connects the airport with Japan National Route 409 and Shuto Expressway Route K6 to the southwest across Tama River.

The airport has five parkades with P1 and P2 parkades serving Terminal 1, P3 and P4 serving Terminal 2, and P5 serving Terminal 3.

Bus
Scheduled bus service to various points in the Kanto region is provided by Airport Transport Service (Airport Limousine) and Keihin Kyuko Bus. Tokyo City Air Terminal, Shinjuku Expressway Bus Terminal and Yokohama City Air Terminal are major limousine bus terminals.

Transfer to/from Narita Airport
Haneda Airport is approximately 1.5 to 2 hours from Narita Airport by rail or bus. Keisei runs direct suburban trains (called "Access Express") between Haneda and Narita in 93 minutes for ¥1800 as of February 2019. There are also direct buses between the airports operated by Airport Limousine Bus. The journey takes 65–85 minutes or longer depending on traffic.

Accidents and incidents
August 24, 1938:  originating from Haneda, one operated by Japan Air Transport and another by Japan Flight School, collided into each other mid-air. All 5 crews of both aircraft died as well as 80 people on the ground in the Ōmori area of Tokyo.
In the span of a month in 1966, three accidents occurred at, or on flights inbound to or outbound from, Haneda.
All 133 passengers and crew were killed. The accident held the death toll record for a single-plane accident until 1969.
March 4, 1966: Canadian Pacific Air Lines Flight 402, a Douglas DC-8-43 registered CF-CPK, descended below the glide path and struck the approach lights and a seawall during a night landing attempt in poor visibility. The flight had departed Hong Kong Kai Tak Airport and had almost diverted to Taipei due to the poor weather at Haneda. Of the 62 passengers and 10 crew, only 8 passengers survived.
On March 5, 1966, less than 24 hours after the Canadian Pacific crash, BOAC Flight 911, a Boeing 707–436 registered G-APFE, broke up in flight en route from Haneda Airport to Hong Kong Kai Tak Airport, on a segment of an around-the-world flight. Although there was not a cockpit voice recorder on this aircraft or any distress calls made by the crew, the investigators did find an 8mm film shot by one of the passengers that, when developed, confirmed the accident was consistent with an in-flight breakup and loss of control due to severe turbulence. There is a famous photo of the BOAC plane taxiing past the still smouldering wreckage of the Canadian Pacific DC-8 as it taxied out to the runway for its last ever takeoff.
August 26, 1966: A Japan Air Lines Convair 880, leased from Japan Domestic Airlines on a training flight, crashed after takeoff when after the nose lifted off, the aircraft yawed to the left. At  after the plane went off the runway and all the engines separated as well as the nose and left main gear. The aircraft caught fire. All five occupants died. Cause of left yaw unknown. 
March 17, 1977: , a Boeing 727-81 flight departing from Haneda to Sendai, was hijacked by a yakuza shortly after takeoff. The aircraft quickly returned to the airport due to the hijacker firing his pistol. The hijacker locked himself inside the aircraft toilet before killing himself.
February 9, 1982: Japan Airlines Flight 350, a McDonnell Douglas DC-8-61, crashed on approach in shallow water  short of the runway when the captain, experiencing some form of a mental aberration, deliberately engaged the thrust-reversers for two of the four engines. Twenty-four passengers were killed.
August 12, 1985: Japan Airlines Flight 123, a Boeing 747SR, lost control and suffered rapid decompression 12 minutes after takeoff due to improper maintenance, leading to the aircraft having a fatal collision with Mount Takamagahara. Out of all 524 people on the flight, four only survived the crash. One of the casualties was famous Japanese singer Kyu Sakamoto. It is the deadliest single-aircraft accident in aviation history.
July 23, 1999: All Nippon Airways Flight 61 was hijacked shortly after takeoff. The hijacker killed the captain before he was subdued; the aircraft landed safely.
May 27, 2016: Korean Air Flight 2708, a Boeing 777-3B5 bound for Gimpo Airport, suffered an engine fire as it was taking off Haneda's Runway 34R. The takeoff was aborted and all passengers and crew aboard were swiftly evacuated. Investigations later determined the cause of the engine fire as an uncontained engine failure caused by maintenance crew oversight.
August 2021: After the Tokyo Olympics, Belarusian officials tried to force Belarusian athlete Krystsina Tsimanouskaya onto a Belarus-bound plane at Tokyo's airport. At the airport, airport police stopped the repatriation and took her to a safe area at the airport. She was able to fly to Poland after they gave her a humanitarian visa.

References

External links

 Haneda Tokyo International Airport Website 
 Tokyo International Air Terminal Corporation 

1931 establishments in Japan
Airports established in 1931
Airports in Tokyo
 
Ōta, Tokyo
Tokyo Bay
Transport in the Greater Tokyo Area